William Canfield is an American politician. He represents the Rutland-3 district in the Vermont House of Representatives.

References 

Members of the Vermont House of Representatives
Living people
Year of birth missing (living people)
Place of birth missing (living people)